Morning Telegraph may refer to:

 Sheffield Telegraph, known as Morning Telegraph from 11 January 1966 to 8 February 1986
 The Morning Telegraph, a New York City newspaper devoted mostly to theatrical and horse racing news; published from 1833 to 1972

See also
Telegraph (disambiguation)
The Telegraph (disambiguation)
Evening Telegraph

Lists of newspapers